Tüpraş Izmir Oil Refinery is an oil refinery in Izmir, western Turkey. It is owned and operated by Tüpraş, the country's only oil refiner with four refineries.

Izmir Oil Refinery is located at Aliağa district of İzmir Province. It became operational in 1972 with an annual crude oil refining capacity of about 5.0 million tonnes. Following investments for expansion and modernization, its annual refining capacity reached 10.0 million tonnes in 1987. After the overhaul works took place in 2007, the capacity increased to 11.0 million tonnes per year. In 2016, the refinery processed crude oil and byproducts of 11.7 million tonnes in total. The products are liquefied petroleum gas (LPG), petroleum naphtha, gasoline, jet fuel (ATF), diesel fuel, base oil, heating oil, fuel oil, asphalt base, wax and some others. Izmir Refinery is the country's only facility, which has a grease production complex with an annual capacity of 400,000 tonnes. ın 2016, products in total of 10.4 million tonnes were sold, being 7.3 million tonnes at domestic markets. The storage capacity of the refinery is 2.51 million tonnes. The facility has a Nelson complexity index of 7.66. 1,353 personnel are employed in the facility.

References

Oil refineries in Turkey
Buildings and structures in İzmir Province
Industrial buildings completed in 1972
Izmir
Aliağa District
Soviet Union–Turkey relations
Economy of İzmir Province